Mahakalesvarar Temple is a Siva temple in Anai Mahalam in Nagapattinam district in Tamil Nadu (India).

Vaippu Sthalam
It is one of the shrines of the Vaippu Sthalams sung by Tamil Saivite Nayanar Appar.

Presiding deity
The presiding deity is known as Mahakalesvarar. The Goddess is known as Mangalanayaki.

Speciality
It is said that when Subramania came to worship Lord Shiva at Kilvelur, this place was worshipped by Kali.

References

Hindu temples in Nagapattinam district
Shiva temples in Nagapattinam district